Aurivittia aurivittata, the dark yellow-banded flat, is a species of hesperiid butterfly which is found in South Asia and Southeast Asia.

Range
The butterfly occurs in India, Bhutan, Myanmar, Thailand, Laos, the Malay Peninsula, Borneo and southern Yunnan. In India, the butterfly ranges across the Himalayas to Sikkim eastwards to southern Myanmar.

Evans: Assam to south Myanmar, south Mergui, Malaya, Sumatra, Kota Kina Balu, Borneo
Savela:

Status
In 1932, William Harry Evans reported that A. aurivittata was not rare in India and north Myanmar, but was rare elsewhere.

Cited references

References

Print

Online
 

Celaenorrhinini
Butterflies of Asia